Barnstead may refer to:
Barnstead, New Hampshire, an American town
William A. Barnstead (1919–2009), an American businessman and politician 
John Henry Barnstead, coroner after the sinking of the Titanic

See also
Banstead